Leonard Hall may refer to:

People
Leonard Hall (boxer) (born 1907), Rhodesian and later South African boxer
Leonard Hall (socialist) (born 1866), British trade unionist and socialist activist
Leonard J. Hall (born 1943), American politician in the state of Florida
Leonard W. Hall (1900–1979), former United States Representative from New York

Buildings
Leonard Hall (Shaw University), a historic educational building in Raleigh, North Carolina, built in 1881
Dr. Leonard Hall House, a former residence listed on the National Register of Historic Places

Hall, Leonard
Architectural disambiguation pages